Sir Francis Dyke Acland, 14th Baronet,  (7 March 1874 – 9 June 1939) was a British Liberal politician. He notably served as Under-Secretary of State for Foreign Affairs under Sir Edward Grey between 1911 and 1915. Ideologically, he was an adherent of the "New Liberalism" within the Liberal Party.

Background and education
Acland was the son of Sir Arthur Dyke Acland, 13th Baronet, and Alice Sophia Cunningham, daughter of Reverend Francis Macaulay Cunningham. He was educated at Rugby and Balliol College, Oxford. He worked as a junior examiner in the education department in South Kensington from 1900 to 1903, and as assistant director for secondary education in the West Riding of Yorkshire in 1903.

Political career
Acland was elected as the Member of Parliament (MP) for Richmond, Yorkshire, in 1906, a seat he held until 1910, and later represented Camborne from 1910 to 1922, Tiverton from 1923 to 1924 and North Cornwall from 1932 to 1939. He was Parliamentary Private Secretary to Richard Haldane, the Secretary of State for War, from 1906 to 1908. He held government office in the Liberal Ministry of H. H. Asquith firstly as Financial Secretary to the War Office from 1908 to 1910. In 1911 he was promoted to Under-Secretary of State for Foreign Affairs to work closely under Sir Edward Grey. He remained in this position throughout the buildup of tensions in Europe which led to the outbreak of war. In February 1915 he was moved to the post of Financial Secretary to the Treasury before being moved again in June 1915 to Parliamentary Secretary to the Board of Agriculture and Fisheries. When Asquith formed his Coalition Government in 1916 Acland was left out of office to accommodate Unionist nominees. In 1915 he was sworn of the Privy Council.

In 1917 he was appointed Chairman of the Departmental Committee "to inquire into the extent and gravity of the evils of dental practice by persons not qualified under the Dentists Act [1878]." Based on the recommendations of this committee a bill was introduced into parliament which eventually became the Dentists Act 1921 which established the Dental Board of the United Kingdom. Acland was appointed its first chairman – a position he held until his death.

Acland also was influential in setting up the Forestry Commission and served as a commissioner until his death, a Deputy Lieutenant of Devon and a Justice of the Peace for Devon and the North Riding of Yorkshire. In 1926 he succeeded his father as fourteenth Baronet.

Family
Acland married firstly Eleanor Margaret Cropper, daughter of Charles James Cropper, in 1895. They had three sons and one daughter. After Eleanor's death in December 1933 he married secondly Constance, daughter of George Dudley, in 1937. Acland died in June 1939, aged 65, and was succeeded by his eldest son from his first marriage, Richard. Lady Dyke Acland died in October 1940. His second son, Geoffrey Acland, became a leading figure in the Liberal Party. His great-grandson, Chris Acland became the drummer for shoegaze band Lush.

Audio Recordings 
 The Liberal Land Policy, 20 April 1929, WA-8854-55
 Care of the Teeth, 15 August 1929, WAX 5141-42

References

External links 
 

1874 births
1939 deaths
Francis Dyke 1874
People educated at Rugby School
Alumni of Balliol College, Oxford
Acland of Columb John, 14th Baronet
Deputy Lieutenants of Devon
Liberal Party (UK) MPs for English constituencies
Members of the Privy Council of the United Kingdom
Members of the Parliament of the United Kingdom for Camborne
UK MPs 1906–1910
UK MPs 1910–1918
UK MPs 1918–1922
UK MPs 1923–1924
UK MPs 1931–1935
UK MPs 1935–1945
Members of the Parliament of the United Kingdom for North Cornwall
Members of the Parliament of the United Kingdom for Tiverton
English justices of the peace